Bibencio Servín Paredes (born 2 November 1984), known as Bibencio Servín, is a Paraguayan footballer.

Servín was a key part of A.C. Barnechea's 2013–14 Primera B side that won the club's first promotion to the Primera División de Chile. He scored the deciding goal in the semi-final of the playoffs against Santiago Morning, and helped the club win the final on penalties.

Honors

Club
Curicó Unido
 Primera B de Chile (1): 2008

References

External links
 
 

1984 births
Living people
Paraguayan footballers
Paraguayan expatriate footballers
Lota Schwager footballers
2 de Mayo footballers
Cobreloa footballers
Curicó Unido footballers
San Luis de Quillota footballers
Primera B de Chile players
Expatriate footballers in Chile
Association football forwards